This is a list of the governorates of Egypt by Human Development Index as of 2023 with data for the year 2021.

See also
List of countries by Human Development Index

References 

Egypt
Egypt
Human Development Index